Quercus miyagii is a species of oak native to the Ryukyu Islands.  It is placed in subgenus Cerris, section Cyclobalanopsis.

References

miyagii
Flora of the Ryukyu Islands
Plants described in 1912